Radio Bremen Melodie (Radio Bremen 3 – Melodie) was a German, public radio station owned and operated by the Radio Bremen (RB).

References

Radio Bremen
Defunct radio stations in Germany
Radio stations established in 1964
Radio stations disestablished in 2001
1964 establishments in West Germany
2001 disestablishments in Germany
Mass media in Bremen (city)